KDDQ (105.3 FM) is a radio station broadcasting a classic rock music format. Licensed to Comanche, Oklahoma, United States. The station is currently owned by Mollman Media, Inc.

References

External links

DDQ
Classic rock radio stations in the United States
Radio stations established in 1984